Zhou Xin may refer to:

Zhou Xin (Han Dynasty) (周昕), a military general serving under the Han Dynasty warlord Wang Lang
Zhou Xin (紂辛), another name for King Zhou of Shang
Zhou Xin (footballer) (born 1998), Chinese footballer
 Zhou Xin (table tennis) (周鑫), American table tennis player and coach